Basukedar is a village in the Rudraprayag district of Uttarakhand state in northern India. It is situated about 5 km from Chandrapuri on Dadoli Guptakashi road.

References
Atkinson, Edwin T. Notes on the History of Religion in the Himálaya

Villages in Rudraprayag district